Titanique is a jukebox musical with a book by Tye Blue, Marla Mindell, and Constantine Rousouli. The musical is based on and parodies the 1997 film Titanic by James Cameron. 

The show premiered in Los Angeles in 2017. It began an off-Broadway run at The Asylum Theatre on June 23, 2022, running until November 13, 2022. The show re-opened at the Daryl Roth Theatre on November 20, 2022 and is slated to close September 10, 2023.

Productions

Los Angeles (2017) 
The show premiered at Los Angeles' Sorting Room Theater as a one-night-only experience titled Titanique: In Concert on December 14, 2017. Book writer Tye Blue directed with co-writers Marla Mindell and Constantine Rousouli starring as Céline Dion and Jack, respectively, joined by Alex Ellis, who starred as Rose. Other cast members included Peter Porte, Tom Lenk, Drew Droege, Sebastian La Cause, Katherine Tokarz, Tom Detrinis, and Adam Zelasko.

New York Premiere (2018) 
The show held a limited engagement at New York's Green Room 42 inside the Yotel hotel from August 25-27, 2018 with Mindell, Rousouli, Ellis, La Cause, and Zelasko returning. Joining the cast were Stephen Guarino, Kathy Deitch, and Mikhail Thompson.

Off-Broadway (2022) 
The original off-Broadway production began previews at The Asylum Theatre in New York City on June 14, 2022 with an official opening on June 23, 2022. It was once again directed by Blue and choreographed by Eleanore Scott. It starred Mindell as Dion, Rousouli as Jack, Ellis as Rose, Frankie Grande as Victor Garber, Deitch as Margaret "Molly" Brown, Ryan Duncan as Ruth, John Riddle as Cal, and Jaye Alexander as The Iceberg. The creative team was rounded out with scenic design by Gabriel Hainer Evansohn, costumes by Alejo Vietti, sound design by Lawrence Schober, lighting by Paige Seber, and hair/makeup/wigs by Tommy Kurzman. The production was seen by several people associated with the film, such as Victor Garber, as well as Dion's manager and publicist. The production closed on November 13, 2022.

The production re-opened on November 20, 2022 at the Daryl Roth Theatre with the same creative team. Several members of the company remained, except for Ellis, Deitch, Duncan, Riddle, and Alexander, who were replaced by Carrie St. Louis, Desireé Rodriguez, Russel Daniels, Ken Wulf Clark, and Avionce Hoyles, respectively. Grande departed the show on December 22, 2022, and the role of Victor Garber was assumed by Wulf Clark, with Mark Evans taking over the role of Cal, on December 24, 2022. Rosé assumed the role of Garber on January 26, 2023. 

On March 8, 2023, the production announced that it would close September 10 of the same year.

Premise 
Céline Dion hijacks a Titanic Museum tour and enchants the audience with her totally wild take, recharting the course of Titanic’s beloved moments and characters with her iconic song catalog.

The musical follows the main events of the 1997 film, with the exception of the present-day framing device of treasure hunters searching for the Heart of the Ocean. The musical additionally uses pop culture references throughout the show, referencing properties like RuPaul's Drag Race and Unbreakable Kimmy Schmidt.

Musical Numbers 
Off-Broadway Production

 "(A) New Day Has Come"
 "All By Myself"
 "Beauty and the Beast"
 "I Drove All Night"
 "I Surrender"
 "I'm Alive"
 "If You Asked Me To"
 "My Heart Will Go On"
 "River Deep, Mountain High"
 "Seduces Me"
 "Taking Chances"
 "Tell Him"
 "The Prayer"
 "To Love You More"
 "You and I"
 "Where Does My Heart Beat Now"
 "Who Let the Dogs Out"

Casts

Notable Replacements

Off-Broadway (2022-23) 

 Victor Garber: Rosé
 Cal: Mark Evans

References

External links 

 Official website

2017 musicals
Celine Dion
Jukebox musicals
Musicals based on films
Off-Broadway musicals
Titanic (1997 film)